Events in the year 2022 in Tunisia.

Incumbents
 President: Kais Saied
 Prime Minister: Hichem Mechichi, Najla Bouden
 President of the Assembly of the Representatives by the People: Rached Ghannouchi
Government: Mechichi Cabinet, Bouden Cabinet

Cabinet

Events
Ongoing — COVID-19 pandemic in Tunisia
 25 July - Tunisia holds the 2022 Tunisian constitutional referendum, which will change Tunisia's semi-presidential system into presidential system.
 15 October - Thousands pour onto the streets and demand President Kais Saied to resign.
 17 December - 2022 Tunisian parliamentary election.

Sports

 2022 Tunis Open

Deaths

 19 December - Jamilia Ksiksi, 54, politician, MP (2014–2021), traffic collision.

References

External links

 
2020s in Tunisia
Years of the 21st century in Tunisia
Tunisia
Tunisia